Arts '73, Arts '74 and Arts '75 was a Canadian television series which aired on CBC Television between March 8, 1973, and June 22, 1975. The show was hosted by Helen Hutchinson (1973), Sol Littman (1974) and Pat Patterson (1974–1975)

Some of the featured people included painter A.Y. Jackson, radio producer Andrew Allan, painter Jack Chambers, film historian John Kobal, tapestry maker Tamara Jaworski and composer Marek Norman.

Arts was a newsmagazine which featured items and guests from the subject of arts including visual, literary and performing arts in Canada and international.

Notes

External links
 Queen's University Directory of CBC Television Series (Arts '73/'74/'75 archived listing link via archive.org)
 Arts '73/'74/'75 at the Canadian Communications Foundation
 TVArchive.ca article
 Memorable TV article

1973 Canadian television series debuts
1975 Canadian television series endings
CBC Television original programming
1970s Canadian television news shows